People's Theatre may refer to:

People's Theatre, Newcastle upon Tyne, in England
Ludowy Theatre, in Kraków, Poland
Volksbühne, in Berlin, Germany
Volkstheater, Vienna, in Austria
Mansudae People's Theatre, in Pyongyang, North Korea

See also
Indian People's Theatre Association